Robin Luca Kehr (born 22 February 2000) is a German professional footballer who plays as a forward for Bundesliga club Greuther Fürth.

Career
Kehr made his professional debut for Greuther Fürth in the 2. Bundesliga on 4 October 2020, coming on as a substitute in the 78th minute for Jamie Leweling against Würzburger Kickers, which finished as a 2–2 away draw.

References

External links
 
 
 
 
 

2000 births
Living people
People from Pinneberg
Footballers from Schleswig-Holstein
German footballers
Germany youth international footballers
Association football forwards
SpVgg Greuther Fürth II players
SpVgg Greuther Fürth players
2. Bundesliga players
Regionalliga players